Richard Dinsdale known as WEISS, is a UK-based music producer, artist and DJ. His primary style of music is House. WEISS’ musical influences include Motown, Metallica and Phil Collins. Dinsdale was notably an apprentice to Massive Attack's musical engineer James Day in his early career.

Biography
In 2018, he had his first successful single ‘Feel My Needs’ that went on to become a Silver certified record in the UK. WEISS then signed a record deal with Island Records in the UK and followed that up with a collaboration with Becky Hill ‘I Could Get Used to This’ which went on to become Gold certified. In 2020, he released ‘First Sight’ and ‘Where Do We Go’.

In 2018, WEISS had an appearance at the Best of British Awards of the British DJ Magazine where he won in the Best Single category for Feel My Needs.

Discography

Singles 
 2015: Our Love
 2015: The Light
 2015: Get Em Funk
 2016: You're Sunshine
 2016: Rollin
 2016: She Said
 2017: Say It To Me (mit Christian Nielsen)
 2018: Feel My Needs
 2018: Bergerac
 2018: Chicken Dinner
 2019: I Could Get Used to This (mit Becky Hill)
 2019: Let Me Love You
 2020: First Sight
 2020: Where Do We Go

References

External links
 

British DJs
British record producers
Living people
Year of birth missing (living people)